Irena Škulj (born 17 January 1946) is a former Yugoslavian tennis player.

Playing for Yugoslavia in the Fed Cup, Škulj has accumulated a win/loss record of 0–4. In 1968 French Open singles Didn't play in the first round. She withdrew from the tournament in the second round.

Career finals

Singles (0–4)

Doubles (7–4)

References

External links 

 

1946 births
Living people
Yugoslav female tennis players